The Imperial Cruise is a non-fiction book authored by James Bradley.  In the book Bradley examines American policy in the Pacific during the presidency of Theodore Roosevelt, and a surrounding a secret diplomatic/Congressional mission to Asia conceived by Roosevelt which would affect United States involvement in Asia.  The material also covers a wide array of other cultural factors that loosely relate to this, the largest diplomatic delegation ever sent to Asia in U.S. history. The book asserts that Roosevelt's diplomatic mistakes constituted the original encouragement for the Japanese imperialism that ultimately backfired on the United States and led to the war in the Pacific, and acted as a catalyst in the fomentation of many subsequent events in Asia, including the Chinese Communist Revolution, the Korean War, and even the current state of U.S.-Asia affairs today in the 21st century. In support of the book's themes, Bradley presents evidence in the form of Roosevelt's personal letters and pictures.  Nevertheless, the book's historical accuracy has proved controversial, with some historians, specialists and reviewers pointing out Bradley's methods as faulty.

Synopsis
The book centers on the diplomatic mission of the  sent by President Theodore Roosevelt in the summer of 1905. On board was the largest diplomatic mission delegation in U.S. history, including some of the highest profile political figures of the time.  They included Secretary of War (and future President) William Howard Taft; Roosevelt's daughter, Alice Roosevelt; her future husband, Congressman (and later Speaker of the House) Nicholas Longworth; along with 29 other members of the House and Senate, and their wives; and an array of additional high-ranking military and civilian officials.

After his initial description and introduction of the SS Manchuria's voyage, the author explores brief excerpts of the history behind the period's American domestic and foreign policy, elaborating on its influence, motivation, and consequences, specifically in regard to American-Japanese, Sino-Japanese, and Russo-Japanese relations.

More broadly, Bradley explores his contention relating to how deep-set racial tendencies, biases and racially deterministic philosophies fueled and undergirded virtually all U.S. foreign and domestic policy-making in that era pertaining to U.S. relations with other nations and to populations of other racial, cultural or religious heritages.  This included virtually all peoples of non-Teutonic Anglo-Saxon descent, and resulted, for example, in the slaughter of more than 250,000 Filipinos during the U.S. colonial take-over of the Philippines.

It is Bradley's contention that the actions of one Roosevelt, and the diplomatic cruise in the summer of 1905, lit that fuse that would doom more than 100,000 U.S. military to die in the Pacific theater decades later under another Roosevelt in the 1940s.  Through what Bradley describes as their "bumbling diplomacy", he describes how Teddy Roosevelt and his emissary Taft turned previously friendly Japanese sentiment, against the United States.

Critical reception
The Imperial Cruise has received mixed reviews.  Writing for The New York Times Review of Books, Janet Maslin noted that "The Imperial Cruise is startling enough to reshape conventional wisdom about Roosevelt's presidency". At the same time, she criticized the author, which favors "broad strokes and may at times be overly eager to connect historical dots, but he also produces graphic, shocking evidence of the attitudes that his book describes."

USA Today was neutral, calling it useful for readers who think that history "is the story of good guys and bad guys", and expressing disappointment with the "relentlessly sarcastic" tone and lack of ambiguity.  Chiefly, USA Today noted an unresolved historical issue at the heart of Bradley's thesis, which argues that Japan was inspired by the visit of the U.S. delegation to pursue imperialistic expansion in 1905, when Japan had no such ambitions.  Bradley's book argues that it was the American delegation's seminal influence that both inspired Japanese imperialistic adventurism, including eventually and ironically, their attack on Pearl Harbor, and also continuing tensions between the United States and Asian nations. While Bradley argues that "The U.S. Army had brought the Aryan to the Pacific coast", USA Today cited his  failure to explain how "in the 1930s, imperial Japan would act on the secret words of a man dead for more than a decade and out of office since 1909."

Scholars such as  M. Patrick Cullinane of Northumbria University rejects Bradley's main themes as extreme exaggerations based on misinterpretations. He says the treatment of Roosevelt is "grossly unfair" and Bradley ignores the Asian role in the multiple catastrophes blamed on Roosevelt.

Professor William N. Tilchin of Boston University attacks "Bradley's stupendously faulty analysis, The Imperial Cruise is a profoundly ignorant book even on the basic level of undisputed objective facts."  He writes:
The pomposity and the utter absurdity of The Imperial Cruise are starkly previewed in a single sentence in the book's sixth paragraph:  "This book reveals that behind [Roosevelt's] Asian whispers that critical summer of 1905 was a very big stick—the bruises from which would catalyze World War II in the Pacific, the Chinese Communist Revolution, the Korean War, and an array of tensions that inform our lives today." (24)  This grandiose, ridiculous assertion is made without even the remotest understanding of Theodore Roosevelt's diplomacy or of either U.S. foreign policy or internal Japanese developments between 1905 and 1941.  The central notion that TR "gave" Korea to Japan—when Japan actually had previously secured control of Korea—is preposterous and, moreover, completely fails to explore the president's main alternative to endorsing Japanese rule:  TR could have gratuitously antagonized Japan over this matter, thereby endangering the U.S. position in the Philippines and, more generally, signaling the Japanese that they should view the United States as a hostile rival.

Currently, The Imperial Cruise holds a 3.4/5 rating on LibraryThing.

Other works by James Bradley

Flags of Our Fathers (with Ron Powers).  New York: Bantam, 2000. 
Flyboys: A True Story of Courage.  Boston: Little, Brown & Co., 2003.

See also
 Alice Roosevelt
 Japan–United States relations

References

2009 non-fiction books
21st-century history books
History books about the United States
History books about the Empire of Japan
History books about politics
History books about World War II
Back Bay Books books